Dying To Be Me is a 2015 Indian Telugu-language short film written and directed by Deva Katta, starring Ravi Varma and Smita. The film highlights woman empowerment.

The film takes its name from a New York Times best selling book Dying To Be Me by Anita Moorjani. At the 1:20 mark in the video, the cover of this book is shown briefly but the author's name is blacked out.

On 15 April 2015, Deadline Hollywood reported that the New York Times best selling book Dying To Be Me has been optioned to internationally acclaimed producer Ridley Scott's company Ridley Scott Films.

In the book, the author recounts stories of her childhood in Hong Kong, her challenge to establish her career and find true love, as well as how she eventually ended up in that hospital bed where she defied all medical knowledge.

As part of a traditional Hindu family residing in a largely Chinese and British society, she had been pushed and pulled by cultural and religious customs since she had been a little girl. After years of struggling to forge her own path while trying to meet everyone else's expectations, she had the realization that she had the power to heal herself ... and that there are miracles in the Universe that she had never even imagined. In Dying to Be Me, Anita freely shares all she has learned about illness, healing, fear, "being loved," and the true magnificence of each and every human being.

Deva Katta appears to have based his film script on the synopsis of the book Dying To Be Me'' as it is shown on Amazon Kindle.

References

2010s Telugu-language films
Indian short films
2015 films
2015 short films